Douglass Rupert Dumbrille (October 13, 1889 – April 2, 1974) was a Canadian actor who appeared regularly in films from the early 1930s.

Life and career
Douglass Dumbrille was born in Hamilton, Ontario. As a young man, he was employed as a bank clerk in Hamilton while pursuing an interest in acting. He eventually left banking for the theatre, finding work with a stock company that led him to Chicago, Illinois, and another that toured the United States. 

In 1913, the East Coast film industry was flourishing and that year he appeared in the film What Eighty Million Women Want, but it would be another 11 years before he appeared on screen again. In 1924, he made his Broadway debut and worked off and on in the theatre for several years while supplementing his income by selling such products as car accessories, tea, insurance, real estate, and books. 

During the Great Depression, Dumbrille resumed his screen career in Hollywood, where he specialized in playing secondary character roles alongside the great stars of the day. His physical appearance and suave voice equipped him for roles as slick politician, corrupt businessman, crooked sheriff, or unscrupulous lawyer. He was highly regarded by the studios, and was sought out by Cecil B. DeMille, Frank Capra, Hal Roach and other prominent Hollywood filmmakers. 

He played similar roles in Capra's film Broadway Bill (1934) (and the 1950 remake, Riding High), and DeMille's version of The Buccaneer (1938, and the 1958 remake). A friend of fellow Canadian-born director Allan Dwan, Dumbrille played Athos in Dwan's adaptation of The Three Musketeers (1939).

Dumbrille had roles in more than 200 motion pictures. He also played villainous roles in comedies, projecting a balance of menace and pomposity opposite the Marx Brothers, Abbott and Costello, and The Bowery Boys.

He portrayed the Egyptian priest and magician Jannes in DeMille's final film, The Ten Commandments (1956).

With the advent of television, Dumbrille made numerous appearances in the 1950s and 1960s. He played a flustered tycoon driven to distraction by Gracie Allen on the Burns and Allen episode "Company for Christmas" (1955). He was cast in six episodes of the religion anthology series, Crossroads. He portrayed Senator Bates in "Thanksgiving Prayer" (1956) with Ron Hagerthy of Sky King. Dumbrille then portrayed Mr. Willoughby in "Big Sombrero" (1957). He guest-starred in the 1957 episode "The Fighter" of the CBS situation comedy Mr. Adams and Eve. In 1958, he was cast as Mayor John Geary in three episodes of the NBC western series, The Californians. He subsequently guest-starred in Frank Aletter's CBS sitcom, Bringing Up Buddy. He portrayed Mr. Osborne in six episodes of the 1963–1964 situation comedy The New Phil Silvers Show.

Dumbrille made two guest appearances as a judge on CBS's Perry Mason; in 1964 he played Judge Robert Adler in "The Case of the Latent Lover", and in 1965 he played an unnamed judge in "The Case of the Duplicate Case". In his final television role, he portrayed a doctor in episode 10 of Batman in February 1966.

Personal life
Dumbrille's wife Jessie Lawson, mother of their son John and daughter Douglass (Dougie), died in 1957 after 47 years of marriage. In 1960, at the age of 70, Dumbrille married Patricia Mowbray, the 28-year-old daughter of his friend and fellow actor, Alan Mowbray. In response to criticism of the May–December marriage, Dumbrille rebuffed: "Age doesn’t mean a blasted thing. The important thing is whether two people can be happy together. Pat and I agreed that I had some years left and we could best share them together. We don’t give a continental damn what other people think."

Dumbrille died of a heart attack on April 2, 1974, at the Motion Picture Country Home and Hospital in Woodland Hills, California.

Selected filmography

What 80 Million Women Want (1913, silent film) as Minor Role
The Declaration of Independence (1924, Short) as Thomas Paine
His Woman (1931) as Alisandroe (uncredited)
The Wiser Sex (1932) as Chauffeur - aka The Wop
Blondie of the Follies (1932) as Murchenson
That's My Boy (1932) as Coach 'Daisy' Adams
 The Pride of the Legion (1932) as McMahon
I Am a Fugitive from a Chain Gang (1932) as District Attorney (uncredited)
Laughter in Hell (1933) as Ed Perkins
Hard to Handle (1933) as District Attorney (uncredited)
Smoke Lightning (1933) as Sam Edson
King of the Jungle (1933) as Ed Peters
Rustlers' Roundup (1933) as Bill Brett
The Working Man (1933) as Hammersmith - Lawyer (uncredited)
Elmer, the Great (1933) as Stillman (uncredited)
The Silk Express (1933) as Myton Associate (uncredited)
Heroes for Sale (1933) as Jim - Chief Engineer (uncredited)
The Man Who Dared (1933) as Judge Collier
Baby Face (1933) as Brody
Voltaire (1933) as Actor - Oriental King in Play (uncredited)
The Big Brain (1933) as Dan Thomas
I Loved a Woman (1933) as U.S. Attorney Brandt (uncredited)
The Way to Love (1933) as Agent Chapusard
Female (1933) as George Mumford
The World Changes (1933) as Buffalo Bill Cody
Lady Killer (1933) as Spade Maddock
Convention City (1933)
Massacre (1934) as Sen. Emory - Chairman (uncredited)
Hi, Nellie! (1934) as Dawes
Journal of a Crime (1934) as Germaine Cartier
Harold Teen (1934) as H.H. Snatcher
Fog Over Frisco (1934) as Mayard
Operator 13 (1934) as Gen. Stuart
Treasure Island (1934) as Israel Hands
Hide-Out (1934) as DeSalle - Nightclub Owner
Broadway Bill (1934) as Eddie Morgan
The Secret Bride (1934) as Breeden
The Lives of a Bengal Lancer (1935) as Mohammed Khan
Naughty Marietta (1935) as Uncle
Cardinal Richelieu (1935) as Count Baradas
Air Hawks (1935) as Victor Arnold
 Unknown Woman (1935) as Phil Gardner
Love Me Forever (1935) as Miller
The Public Menace (1935) as Mario Tonelli
Peter Ibbetson (1935) as Col. Forsythe
Crime and Punishment (1935) as Grilov
The Calling of Dan Matthews (1935) as Jeff Hardy
The Lone Wolf Returns (1935) as Morphew
You May Be Next (1936) as Beau Gardner
The Music Goes 'Round (1936) as Bishop
Mr. Deeds Goes to Town (1936) as John Cedar
The Witness Chair (1936) as Stanley Whittaker
The Princess Comes Across (1936) as Detective Lorel
M'Liss (1936) as Lou Ellis
End of the Trail (1936) as Bill Mason
Counterfeit Lady (1936) as August Marino
Woman in Distress (1937) as Jerome Culver
A Day at the Races (1937) as J.D. Morgan
The Emperor's Candlesticks (1937) as Mr. Korum - a Conspirator
The Firefly (1937) as Marquis de Melito
Ali Baba Goes to Town (1937) as Prince Musah
The Buccaneer (1938) as Governor William C.C. Claiborne
Stolen Heaven (1938) as Klingman
Fast Company (1938) as Arnold Stamper
The Mysterious Rider (1938) as Pecos Bill - aka Ben Wade
Crime Takes a Holiday (1938) as J.J. Grant
Storm Over Bengal (1938) as Ramin Khan
Sharpshooters (1938) as Count Maxim
Kentucky (1938) as John Dillon - 1861
The Three Musketeers (1939) as Athos
Mr. Moto in Danger Island (1939) as La Costa
Tell No Tales (1939) as Matt Cooper
Captain Fury (1939) as Preston
Charlie Chan at Treasure Island (1939) as Thomas Gregory
Thunder Afloat (1939) as District Commander
Rovin' Tumbleweeds (1939) as Stephen Holloway
Charlie Chan in City in Darkness (1939) as Petroff
Slightly Honorable (1939) as George Taylor
Virginia City (1940) as Major Drewery
South of Pago Pago (1940) as Williams
Michael Shayne, Private Detective (1940) as Gordon
Murder Among Friends (1941) as Carter Stevenson
The Round Up (1941) as Capt. Bob Lane
Road to Zanzibar (1941) as Slave Trader
Washington Melodrama (1941) as Donnelly
The Big Store (1941) as Mr. Grover
Ellery Queen and the Perfect Crime (1941) as John Matthews
Castle in the Desert (1942) as Paul Manderley
Ride 'Em Cowboy (1942) as Jake Rainwater
A Gentleman After Dark (1942) as Enzo Calibra
Ten Gentlemen from West Point (1942) as Gen. William Henry Harrison
I Married an Angel (1942) as Baron Szigethy
King of the Mounties (1942) as Harper
Stand By for Action (1942) as Capt. Ludlow
DuBarry Was a Lady (1943) as Willie / Duc de Rigor
False Colors (1943) as Mark Foster
Uncertain Glory (1944) as Police Commissioner LaFarge
Lumberjack (1944) as Daniel J. Keefer
Jungle Woman (1944) as District Attorney
Forty Thieves (1944) as Tad Hammond
Gypsy Wildcat (1944) as Baron Tovar
Lost in a Harem (1944) as Nimativ
Jungle Queen (1945) as Lang
A Medal for Benny (1945) as General
The Frozen Ghost (1945) as Inspector Brant
 Flame of the West (1945) as Marshal Tom Nightlander
The Daltons Ride Again (1945) as Sheriff Hoskins
Road to Utopia (1945) as Ace Larson
Pardon My Past (1945) as Uncle Wills
The Catman of Paris (1946) as Henry Borchard
Night in Paradise (1946) as High Priest
The Cat Creeps (1946) as Tom McGalvey
Spook Busters (1946) as Dr. Coslow
Under Nevada Skies (1946) as Courtney
Monsieur Beaucaire (1946) as George Washington
It's a Joke, Son! (1947) as Big Dan Healey
Dishonored Lady (1947) as District Attorney O'Brien
Dragnet (1947) as Frank Farrington
Blonde Savage (1947) as Mark Harper
Christmas Eve (1947) as Dr. Bunyan
The Fabulous Texan (1947) as Luke Roland
Beyond Our Own (1947) as E.W. Osborne
Last of the Wild Horses (1948) as Charlie Cooper
Dynamite (1949) as Hank Gibbons
Riders of the Whistling Pines (1949) as Henry Mitchell
The Lone Wolf and His Lady (1949) as John J. Murdock
Addio Mimí! (1949) as Rouchard
Alimony (1949) as Burton (Burt) Crail
Joe Palooka in the Counterpunch (1949) as Capt. Lance
Tell It to the Judge (1949) as George Ellerby
Buccaneer's Girl (1950) as Capt. Martos 
Riding High (1950, remake of Broadway Bill) as Eddie Howard
The Savage Horde (1950) as Col. Price
Abbott and Costello in the Foreign Legion (1950) as Sheik Hamud El Khalid
The Kangaroo Kid (1950) as Vincent Moller
Rapture (1950) as W.C. Hutton
A Millionaire for Christy (1951) as J.C. Thompson
Scaramouche (1952) as Assembly President (uncredited)
Son of Paleface (1952) as Sheriff McIntyre
Apache War Smoke (1952) as Maj. Dekker
Sky Full of Moon (1952) as Rodeo Official
Julius Caesar (1953) as Lepidus
Plunder of the Sun (1953) as Consul
Captain John Smith and Pocahontas (1953) as Chief Powhatan
World for Ransom (1954) as Insp. McCollum
The Lawless Rider (1954) as Marshal Brady
Jupiter's Darling (1955) as Scipio
A Life at Stake (1954) as Gus Hillman
Davy Crockett and the River Pirates (1956) as Saloon owner (uncredited) (archive footage)
Shake, Rattle & Rock! (1956) as Eustace Fentwick III
The Ten Commandments (1956) as Jannes
 The Go-Getter (1956) as Dr. Baker
The Buccaneer (1958) as Collector of the Port
High Time (1960) as Judge Carter (uncredited)
Air Patrol (1962) as Millard Nolan
Johnny Cool (1963) as Corrupt City Council Member
What a Way to Go! (1964) as Minor Role (uncredited)
Shock Treatment (1964) as Judge (uncredited)

References

External links

1889 births
1974 deaths
Canadian male silent film actors
Canadian male film actors
Canadian expatriate male actors in the United States
Male actors from Hamilton, Ontario
20th-century Canadian male actors